The Supreme Court of Tasmania is the highest State court in the Australian State of Tasmania. In the Australian court hierarchy, the Supreme Court of Tasmania is in the middle level, with both an appellate jurisdiction over lower courts, and decisions made by Court to be heard on appeal by the High Court of Australia.

The ordinary sittings of the Court occur in Hobart, Launceston and Burnie in Tasmania. The Court's Appeal division sits only in Hobart.

History of the Court

The Supreme Court of Van Diemen's Land (as Tasmania was then known) was established by The Royal Letters Patent of 13 October 1823 and commenced activities on 10 May 1824. The Court is the oldest Supreme Court in Australia and predates the Supreme Court of New South Wales, if only by a period of just ten days. The supreme courts of Tasmania and New South Wales were initiated through the New South Wales Act 1823, and this gave those courts jurisdiction over New Zealand. Sir John Pedder, after whom Lake Pedder is named, was the first Chief Justice of the court.

The first counsel to appear before the Court was Joseph Tice Gellibrand, who was appointed Tasmania's first Attorney-General, and took his oaths on the first day of the new Court. The first case before the Court was the trial of William Tibbs, who was found guilty and sentenced for manslaughter, receiving 3 years transportation.

Jurisdiction of the Court

It has unlimited jurisdiction within the state in civil matters and hears the most serious criminal matters. It is around the middle of the Australian court hierarchy. The Supreme Court consists of a Trial Division (also known as Original Jurisdiction) and an Appeal Division (or Appellate Jurisdiction). When sitting in its appellate jurisdiction in civil matters it is the "Full Court"; for criminal matters it is the "Tasmanian Court of Criminal Appeal".

Appeals from the Appeal Division of the Court are to the High Court of Australia. It was previously possible to appeal decisions of the Court of Appeal or the Court of Criminal Appeal (both parts of the Appeal Division) to the Judicial Committee of the Privy Council in London, but this ceased in 1986 when the Parliament of Australia passed the Australia Act 1986, which terminated all such appeals to the Privy Council from Australian courts, except for those cases pending at that time.

Civil matters involving consent orders, or for disputes involving less than $50,000, are dealt with by the Magistrates Court except in exceptional circumstances.

The Court receives appeals from Magistrate Courts in Tasmania in both criminal and civil matters. Committal proceedings, which are used in criminal matters to establish whether there is sufficient evidence against an accused person to warrant the time and expense of a trial, were abolished in Tasmania in 2000 with the amendment of the Justices Act 1959 (Tas).   The Justices Act 1959 now provides that where there has been a plea of not guilty by an accused, there must be an order committing them for trial in the Supreme Court.

Unlike some other Australian states, Tasmania does not have an intermediate court division between the Supreme Court and the Magistrates Courts (such as a "District Court" or a "County Court").

Composition of the Court

The Supreme Court of Tasmania is composed of up to seven judges appointed by the Governor on the advice of the Executive Council, a body of senior ministers including the state Premier.  the judges of the Supreme Court of Tasmania are:

The Associate Judge, a lower-ranking judicial officer previously called the Master, has responsibility for largely procedural matters in civil and criminal proceedings, and for some work in assessing the damages (amounts claimable) in civil proceedings.

2021 Supreme Court of Tasmania ruling
In February 2021, it was reported by LGBTQI+ media the Star Observer - Tasmania never officially legally ever recognized same-sex relationships at all from a ruling of the Supreme Court of Tasmania.

See also

 Judiciary of Australia
 List of Judges of the Supreme Court of Tasmania
 List of Tasmanian Supreme Court cases

Notes

References

External links
 Supreme Court of Tasmania home page

 
Tasmania

Landmarks in Hobart
1824 establishments in Australia
Courts and tribunals established in 1824